Pieter Jacobsz. Duyfhuysen (1608–1677) was a Dutch Golden Age painter of genre.

Duyfhuysen was born and died in Rotterdam.  According to the RKD he was also known as Colinchovius. He worked in Rotterdam except for a short stay in Haarlem, where he was probably a pupil of Torrentius, during the years 1625–1627.

References

Pieter Jacobsz. Duyfhuysen on Artnet

1608 births
1677 deaths
Dutch Golden Age painters
Dutch male painters
Painters from Rotterdam
Dutch genre painters